Litteral Township is one of thirty-seven townships in Washington County, Arkansas, USA. As of the 2000 census, its total population was 1,410.

Geography

Cities, towns, villages
Savoy
Wedington Woods

Cemeteries
The township contains no cemeteries.

Major routes
 Arkansas Highway 16

References

 United States Census Bureau 2008 TIGER/Line Shapefiles

External links
 US-Counties.com
 City-Data.com

Townships in Washington County, Arkansas
Townships in Arkansas